The Toronto Scottish Regiment (Queen Elizabeth The Queen Mother's Own) is a Primary Reserve infantry regiment of the Canadian Army. It is part of 4th Canadian Division's 32 Canadian Brigade Group.

Lineage

The Toronto Scottish Regiment (Queen Elizabeth The Queen Mother's Own) 
Originated in Toronto, 1 May 1920 as The Mississauga Regiment
Redesignated 1 September 1921 as The Toronto Scottish Regiment
Amalgamated 15 December 1936 with "B" and "C" Companies of the 1st Machine Gun Battalion, CMGC and redesignated as The Toronto Scottish Regiment (Machine Gun)
Redesignated 7 November 1940 as the 2nd Battalion, The Toronto Scottish Regiment (Machine Gun)
Redesignated 19 June 1947 as The Toronto Scottish Regiment
Redesignated 19 October 2000 as The Toronto Scottish Regiment (Queen Elizabeth The Queen Mother's Own)

Lineage chart

Perpetuations

The Great War
75th Battalion (Mississauga), CEF
84th Battalion, CEF

Operational history

The Great War
The 75th Battalion (Mississauga), CEF was authorized on 1 July 1915 and embarked for Great Britain on 29 March 1916. It disembarked in France on 12 August 1916. There it fought as part of the 11th Infantry Brigade, 4th Canadian Division in France and Flanders until the end of the war. The battalion disbanded on 15 September 1920.

The 84th Battalion, CEF was authorized on 10 July 1915 and embarked for Great Britain on 18 June 1916. There, on 30 June 1916, its personnel were absorbed by the 73rd Battalion (Royal Highlanders of Canada), CEF, 75th Battalion (Mississauga), CEF and other units of the 4th Canadian Division, to provide reinforcements for the Canadian Corps in the field. The battalion disbanded on 11 April 1918.

The Second World War
The regiment mobilized as The Toronto Scottish Regiment (Machine Gun), CASF for active service on 1 September 1939. It was redesignated as the 1st Battalion, The Toronto Scottish Regiment (Machine Gun), CASF on 7 November 1940; as the 2nd Infantry
Division Support Battalion (The Toronto Scottish Regiment), CIC, CASF on 1 May 1943; and as the 1st Battalion, The Toronto Scottish Regiment (Machine Gun), CIC, CASF on 24 February 1944. On 7 December 1939, it embarked for Great Britain.
The battalion took part in OPERATION JUBILEE, the raid on Dieppe, on 19 August 1942. It landed again in France on 6 and 7 July 1944, as part of the 2nd Infantry Division. The battalion continued to fight in North-West Europe until the end of the war. The overseas battalion disbanded on 31 December 1945.

Afghanistan
The regiment contributed an aggregate of more than 20% of its authorized strength to the various Task Forces which served in Afghanistan between 2002 and 2014.

Alliances 
 - Highlanders (Seaforth, Gordons and Camerons), 4th Battalion, Royal Regiment of Scotland
 - The London Scottish

Battle honours
Battle honours in small capitals are for large operations and campaigns and those in lowercase are for more specific battles. Bold type indicates honours authorized to be emblazoned on regimental colours.
On 26 October 2015 the Afghanistan battle honour was presented to the regiment and added to the regimental colour by Prince Edward, Earl of Wessex.

History

The First World War 
The 75th (Mississauga) Battalion, the predecessor to The Toronto Scottish Regiment was raised on July 1, 1915, by Lieutenant-Colonel Samuel Beckett. Within three weeks more than 1,500 personnel had been recruited. By March 1916 the battalion was fully trained and sailed for Liverpool. Over 5,500 soldiers served in the battalion during the First World War, of whom 1,049 were killed, including Lieutenant-Colonel Beckett. The 75th Battalion CEF was awarded 16 battle honours, and Captain Bellenden Hutcheson, the medical officer, was awarded the Victoria Cross. In 1921 the regiment was renamed The Toronto Scottish Regiment by the commanding officer of the day, Lieutenant-Colonel Colin Harbottle, CMG, DSO, VD.

The Second World War 
During the Second World War, the regiment initially mobilized a machine gun battalion for the 1st Canadian Infantry Division. Following a reorganization early in 1940, the battalion was reassigned to the 2nd Canadian Infantry Division, where it operated as a support battalion, providing machine-gun detachments for the Operation Jubilee force at Dieppe in 1942, and then with an additional company of mortars, it operated in support of the rifle battalions of the 2nd Division in northwest Europe from July 1944 to VE Day. In April 1940, the 1st Battalion also mounted the King's Guard at Buckingham Palace. The 2nd Battalion served in the reserve army in Canada.

Post War to the Present Day 
In 2000, the regiment added a secondary title in recognition of Queen Elizabeth The Queen Mother's long association as colonel-in-chief. She had held the position since 1938. The regiment was now referred to as "The Toronto Scottish Regiment (Queen Elizabeth The Queen Mother's Own)." The regiment was part of the escort at the funeral of Queen Elizabeth The Queen Mother in April 2002. The regimental tartan is Hodden Grey.

On September 12, 2009, the regimental headquarters, A Company and Administration Company moved to the Captain Bellenden Seymour Hutcheson VC Armoury, which is shared with the Toronto Police Service. The armoury is a green building, earning a Leadership in Energy and Environmental Design (LEEDS) silver rating. On May 8, 2012, 75th Company moved from its previous location in Mississauga to a new shared government facility, The Garry W. Morden Centre, with the City of Mississauga Emergency Training Services.

Toronto Scottish Regiment Museum
The regiment's museum was formerly located at the Fort York Armoury in Toronto.  The museum was opened in 1984 by Queen Elizabeth the Queen Mother.  In September 2009, the museum was relocated to the Captain Bellenden Seymore Hutcheson VC Armoury in Etobicoke and officially re-opened on 1 May 2010.  The museum includes uniforms, weapons, artifacts and military memorabilia.  The museum is open by appointment and during regimental events.

Media
"Carry on." The History of the Toronto Scottish Regiment (M.G.) 1939-1945 by Major D. W. Grant (1949)
"Toronto's Fighting 75th in the Great War 1915 - 1919," by Regimental Historian Timothy J. Stewart CD (2017)

See also
 Canadian-Scottish regiment
 The Canadian Crown and the Canadian Forces
  - 5th/6th Battalion, Royal Victoria Regiment

Notes and references

 Barnes, RM, The Uniforms and History of the Scottish Regiments, London, Sphere Books Limited, 1972.

External links
 
The Toronto Scottish Regiment 
The Toronto Scottish Regiment Pipes and Drums
Profile at The Canadian Army site

Order of precedence

Toronto Scottish Regiment (Queen Elizabeth The Queen Mother's Own)
Toronto Scottish Regiment
Toronto Scottish Regiment
Toronto Scottish Regiment
Military units and formations of Ontario
1920 establishments in Canada